"Mad Dogs and Servicemen" is the 61st episode from M*A*S*H, that originally aired on December 10, 1974. It was written by Linda Bloodworth and Mary Kay Place and directed by Hy Averback.

The guest cast includes Shizuko Hoshi as Rosie, Jeff Maxwell as Private Igor Straminsky, Bobbie Mitchell as Nurse Baker, Michael O'Keefe as Corporal Travis, and Arthur Song as Korean Man.

Overview
A stray dog bites Radar and the 4077th must find it soon or he must begin painful and dangerous vaccinations against rabies. Meanwhile, Pierce is trying to treat a patient with hysterical paralysis.

Detailed story
Radar is feeding his animals World War II surplus powdered milk from a surgical glove when Lieutenant Colonel Blake walks up after having just taken a shower. Blake gives Radar back his pet turtle, which he found in the shower. Radar then interrupts Pierce, who is making out with Nurse Baker, so that he can sign a patient's release form. While signing the form, Pierce notices a scratch on Radar's hand. Radar tells him that a mutt that sticks around the camp bit him. Pierce then informs Radar that rabies and dysentery are two of the most prevalent diseases in Korea, and that the dog needs to be tested to see if it is a carrier.

Orderlies are unloading wounded soldiers from a bus, but Major Burns tells them not to unload one particular soldier because he is not physically wounded and needs to be treated in Tokyo for shell shock. Pierce and McIntyre insist that he be treated at the 4077th against Burns' orders. In the recovery room, Pierce finds out that the soldier, Corporal Travis, was in a fox hole when tanks attacked his unit. He lost consciousness, and when he came to, he couldn't move. Pierce then calls Dr. Sidney Freedman to ask him to come to the 4077th to treat Corporal Travis. Dr. Freedman tells Pierce that he is too busy and recommends a course of action that Pierce should follow. Pierce goes back into the recovery room where Major Houlihan complains to him about the fact that her nurses are having to constantly clean up Corporal Travis because Pierce has ordered that he is not to use a bedpan, but must walk to the latrine. Corporal Travis thinks that Pierce is being overly cruel, but Pierce is following Dr. Freedman's advice by trying to convince him that nothing is physically wrong with his legs.

Radar and Blake are out looking for the dog when they run into Rosie. They ask Rosie if they've seen the dog, and Rosie, in turn, asks a Korean man, who tells Rosie that the dog was delicious. Radar panics until they ask the old man if the dog had a collar, and the man says no, which means that it was not Radar's dog. But, until it is found, Radar must begin the vaccination process.

Major Houlihan tries to comfort Radar after he is given his first dose of the vaccine. She tells him that he has a letter from a young lady and asks if he would like her to read it to him. He says that he would. The letter is from a 17-year-old girl from the United States who got his name from the Red Cross. She tells him a little bit about herself and asks a few questions about him. Radar falls asleep by the time Major Houlihan finishes the letter.

Majors Burns and Houlihan complain to Colonel Blake about Corporal Travis having to crawl to the mess tent to eat. Pierce defends his actions as following the recommendations of Dr. Freedman and that, by sending him home, his guilt will only serve to reinforce his hysterical paralysis. Finally, Corporal Travis opens up to Trapper John.

Blake, looking in on Radar's pets, spots the dog that bit Radar. He and McIntyre chase it all over camp. After they catch it, they determine that it doesn't have rabies, so Radar can stop the treatments. During a meeting of all the doctors in Blake's office and Major Houlihan, Corporal Travis walks in under his own power to prove Pierce and Dr. Freedman were right.

Notes
 This is the first episode Rosie appears in, though she was mentioned in the episode "Iron Guts Kelly." This is also the first time Radar's affinity for animals is established.

M*A*S*H (season 3) episodes
1974 American television episodes